Yiu Tung Public Library is a public library, located in Yiu Tung Estate, Shau Kei Wan, Hong Kong.

Facilities
Adult Lending Library
Junior Lending Library
Newspapers and Periodicals Section
Extension Activities Room
Services
Lending Service
Reservation and Inter-library Loan
Newspapers and Periodicals Service
Outreach Programmes

See also
 List of buildings and structures in Hong Kong
 Hong Kong Public Libraries

External links
Official site

Public libraries in Hong Kong
Shau Kei Wan
Libraries in Hong Kong